Sir Alberto Maria Rodrigues  (5 November 1911 – 5 February 2006) was a Hong Kong medical doctor, academic and politician. He was Senior Unofficial Member of the Executive Council of Hong Kong, and Pro-Chancellor and Chairman of Executive Council of the University of Hong Kong.

Early life and education
He was born on 5 November 1911 (the Guy Fawkes' Day in Hong Kong). His mother's death occurred a few weeks after he was born, his father died when he was nine years old. He was brought up by an uncle who had seven children of his own.

He was educated at St Joseph's College, and the University of Hong Kong with the Inez Soares scholarship. He captained in the University Cricket Eleven and finished at the top of the League in 1932. Rodrigues also a Captain of Hockey and played hockey for Hong Kong. Although he was preoccupied with sporting activities, he passed his medical finals in 1934, receiving his degree and winning the Chan Kai Ming Prize. He studied paediatrics, obstetrics and gynaecology in Lisbon and London in the following three years before he began his private practice in Hong Kong in 1937.

He was a popular sportsman in cricket, tennis and badminton circles, represented Hong Kong at hockey both against Malaya and Macao.

Public services
In the Urban Council election of 1940, he was elected to the Urban Council as the youngest member without aid from any organisation with a political platform. He resumed his office after the war until 1950 when he went to North America.

Dr. Rodrigues was member of the Hong Kong Volunteer Defence Corps and was held prisoner of war as lieutenant in Shamshuipo Camp during the Japanese occupation of Hong Kong. He was promoted to captain and was made a Member of the Order of the British Empire (Military Division) after the war. He was also rewarded with the Order of Christ by Portugal for his services to the Portuguese community in 1949.

In 1950, Dr. Rodrigues went to North America for further post-graduate work. After he returned to Hong Kong in 1953, he was appointed to the Legislative Council in 1959 and to Executive Council where he became the Senior Unofficial Member until his retirement in 1974. He was later on appointed Officer of the Order of the British Empire in 1960 and Commander of the Order the British Empire in 1964. He was also made a Chevalier of the French Legion of Honour in 1962 and made a Knight Grand Cross of the Roman Catholic Order of St. Sylvester in 1966. He was knighted by Queen Elizabeth II in 1971 in recognition of his immense contributions to the community of Hong Kong.

Dr. Rodrigues was appointed Chairman of the Golden Jubilee Celebrations of the University of Hong Kong in 1962. He was rewarded the Doctor of Laws honoris causa in the same year by the University of Hong Kong.

Death
Dr. Rodrigues died at St. Paul's Hospital in Causeway Bay on 5 February 2006. He was pre-deceased by his first wife, Cynthia Maria Silvia in 1987, and by his second wife, Ana Maria (Aninhas) de Azevedo de Castro Basto in 2002. He was survived by his son Albert (Tito) and daughters Ann and Mari, several grandchildren and great-grandchildren. He was buried in the Catholic Cemeteries at the Gardens of Gethsemani in Surrey, British Columbia, Canada.

Citations

References
 'RODRIGUES, Sir Alberto', Who Was Who, A & C Black, 1920–2008; online edn, Oxford University Press, Dec 2009 ; online edn, Nov 2009 accessed 18 Aug 2012
 http://www.burkespeerage.com/familyhomepage.aspx?FID=0&FN=RODRIGUESALBERTO
 https://web.archive.org/web/20131128024449/http://www4.hku.hk/hongrads/index.php/archive/graduate_detail/115

1911 births
2006 deaths
Hong Kong people of Portuguese descent
Alumni of the University of Hong Kong
Members of the Executive Council of Hong Kong
Members of the Legislative Council of Hong Kong
Members of the Urban Council of Hong Kong
Commanders of the Order of the British Empire
Knights Bachelor
Knights of the Order of St. Sylvester
Hong Kong male field hockey players
Hong Kong Roman Catholics
Officers of the Order of Christ (Portugal)
Chevaliers of the Légion d'honneur
World War II prisoners of war held by Japan